Herpotrichiellaceae is a family of ascomycetous fungi within the order Chaetothyriales and within the class Eurotiomycetes. It contains 16 genera and about 270 species. The type genus of the family, Herpotrichiella, is now synonymous with Capronia.

Genera
This is a list of the genera in the Herpotrichiellaceae, based on a 2020 review and summary of fungal classification by Wijayawardene and colleagues. Following the genus name is the taxonomic authority (those who first circumscribed the genus; standardized author abbreviations are used), year of publication, and the number of species:

Aculeata  – 1 sp.
Brycekendrickomyces  – 1 sp.
Capronia  – ca. 81 spp.
Cladophialophora  – 35 spp.
Exophiala  – 51 spp.
Fonsecaea  – 8 spp.
Marinophialophora  – 1 sp.
Melanoctona  – 1 sp.
Metulocladosporiella  – 6 spp.
Minimelanolocus  – 33 spp.
Phialophora  – 7 spp.
Pleomelogramma  – 2 spp.
Rhinocladiella  – 17 spp.
Sorocybe  – 3 spp.
Thysanorea  – 2 spp.
Veronaea  – 20 spp.

References

Eurotiomycetes
Taxa described in 1953
Ascomycota families
Taxa named by Anders Munk